Metro City is the largest private housing estate and shopping centre in Tseung Kwan O, New Territories, Hong Kong, developed by Henderson Land Development. Built on the reclaimed land in Po Lam, the estate was developed in three phases. 

The MTR Po Lam station, terminus of Tseung Kwan O line, is located next to Metro City Phase II. Metro City Phase II also serves as the Po Lam public transit terminal.

Residential blocks
The estate is divided into three phases by the order of their development, offering a total of 6768 units. Phase 1 consists of 6 blocks completed in 1996. Phase 2 consists of 11 blocks completed in 2000. Phase 3, also called The Metropolis, consists of 4 blocks completed in 2002.

Shopping centre
Each phase of Metro City has its own shopping centre. The shopping centre is the largest in Tseung Kwan O and covers 1.5 million square feet in size.  It houses a department store, two grocery stores, a wet market, and over 400 shops.  There are two cinemas in Tseung Kwan O, one is located at Metro City.  

Footbridges connect the three shopping centres. Surrounding housing estates such as The Pinnacle, Verbena Heights, Po Lam Estate, and Yan Ming Court also have direct pedestrian access to Metro City through footbridges.

References

External links

Official website of Metro City
 S.K. Hui, A. Cheung, J. Pang, "A Hierarchical Bayesian Approach for Residential Property Valuation:Application to Hong Kong Housing Market", International Real Estate Review, 2010 Vol. 13 No.1: pp. 1 – 29

Residential buildings completed in 1996
Residential buildings completed in 2000
Residential buildings completed in 2002
Po Lam
Private housing estates in Hong Kong
Shopping centres in Hong Kong
Henderson Land Development
Shopping malls established in 1996
Shopping malls established in 1998
1996 establishments in Hong Kong